The 53rd edition of the Vuelta a Colombia was held from June 16 to June 30, 2003. The cycling race took place over fifteen stages (including a prologue) and 2,200 kilometres.

Stages

2003-06-16: El Rodadero — Santa Marta (6.6 km) 
 Prologue was cancelled

2003-06-17: Santa Marta — Cartagena (225 km)

2003-06-18: Cartagena — Sincelejo (182 km)

2003-06-19: Sincelejo — Caucasia (192 km)

2003-06-20: Caucasia — Yarumal (165 km)

2003-06-21: Yarumal — El Escobero (154 km)

2003-06-22: Barbosa — Puerto Berrío (147 km)

2003-06-23: Piedecuesta — Barichara (132 km)

2003-06-24: Socorro — Duitama (224 km)

2003-06-25: Duitama — Sopó (168 km)

2003-06-26: Soacha — Ibagué (197 km)

2003-06-27: Ibagué — Santa Rosa de Cabal (145 km)

2003-06-28: Cartago — La Unión (47.2 km)

2003-06-29: Tuluá — Kilómetro 18 (163 km)

2003-06-30: Circuito en Cali (99 km)

Jersey progression

Final classification

Teams 

Colombia — Selle Italia

05 Orbitel A

Lotería de Boyacá

Aguardiente Antioqueño

Juegos Nacionales 2004

Lotería del Táchira

Ecuador National Team

Gobernación del Zulia

05 Orbitel B

Mixto Uno — Gobernación de Boyacá

Mixto Dos — EPM.net

Mixto Tres — Sucre — Cicloases

Ciclo Acosta Bello

See also 
 2003 Clásico RCN

References 
 cyclingnews
 pedalear

Vuelta a Colombia
Colombia
Vuelta